Too Much Pussy!  is a 2010 French-German documentary film directed by Émilie Jouvet.  It follows a group of performers who are all members of the sex-positive movement during the tour of their "Queer X Show" through Europe, from Berlin to Malmö.  The group consists of the writer and actress Wendy Delorme, the DJ Metzgerei, the adult actress Judy Minx, the singer Mad Kate, the artist and performer Sadie Lune, and the adult actress and director Madison Young.

The film premiered at the Cinémarges Festival in Bordeaux in April 2010. In 2011, an uncensored version of the film was released, titled Much More Pussy!. It was defined as a "magnificent ode to women in all its forms (...) which is expected soon to become a cult".

References

External links

2010 films
Documentary films about sexuality
French documentary films
German documentary films
German road movies
2010s road movies
Sex positivism
Sex-positive feminism
Documentary films about women
2010s English-language films
2010 documentary films
2010s French films
2010s German films